Port-Saint-Père-Saint-Mars is a railway station in Saint-Mars-de-Coutais, Pays de la Loire, France. The station is located on the Nantes–La Roche-sur-Yon railway. The station is served by TER (local) services operated by the SNCF:
local services (TER Pays de la Loire) Nantes - Sainte-Pazanne - Pornic
local services (TER Pays de la Loire) Nantes - Sainte-Pazanne - Saint-Gilles-Croix-de-Vie

References

TER Pays de la Loire
Railway stations in Loire-Atlantique